Marine Parade Community Building is a community building located in Marine Parade, Singapore. Opened on 6 March 2000, the building houses the formerly separate Marine Parade Community Centre and Marine Parade Public Library, as well as a performing arts group, The Necessary Stage. Designed by William Lim Associates, one of the distinguishing features of the postmodern building is the mural cladding called the "Texturefulness of Life", the largest piece of installation art in Singapore.

History
The current building sits on reclaimed land first occupied by the Marine Parade Community Centre, which was built in the early 1980s and later renamed to Marine Parade Community Club. In March 1995, the People's Association (PA) announced plans to spend S$9.56 million to upgrade 54 community centres and clubs that were over ten years old, adding facilities such as lifts, dance studios, karaoke rooms and multi-purpose air-conditioned activities rooms, to make community centres more user-friendly, with open concept offices and reception areas.

In June 1995, then-Prime Minister Goh Chok Tong asked PA to study the idea of having community centres share their premises with other civil users such as libraries, government offices and commercial developments. Goh, who is also a Member of Parliament for Marine Parade Group Representation Constituency, suggested combining the Marine Parade Community Club, which was slated for upgrading, with the National Library branch in Marine Parade, in a six-storey building with three floors for the community club and three for the library. In June 1996, Wong Kan Seng, PA's deputy chairman, announced that due to the scarcity of land in Singapore, eight of the redeveloped community centres, including Marine Parade Community Club, would be located with other civil users.

As 30% of the upgrading cost had to be paid by the community club, several fundraising activities were carried out for the redevelopment. These activities, which included music concerts, golf tournaments and cyclethons, raised a total of S$6 million. The old club building was demolished in 1997 and construction of the Marine Parade Community Building began the same year. SAL Construction was the project's main contractor. Built at a cost of S$30 million, the new building was completed in January 2000, and was open to the public on 6 March that year. It was officially opened by Goh Chok Tong on 28 May that year.

Facilities

The Marine Parade Community Building currently houses the Marine Parade Community Club, the Marine Parade Community Library and a professional theatre company, The Necessary Stage. It also originally had an al fresco Starbucks café on the ground floor.

Marine Parade Community Club
Opened on 6 March 2000, the Marine Parade Community Club is equipped with a glass-walled gymnasium overlooking part of the East Coast Parkway, a covered basketball court on the rooftop and an air-conditioned sports hall. There are also a 263-seat theatrette, a roof terrace for gatherings, and music, study and activity rooms.

Marine Parade Public Library

Opened on 10 November 1978, the Marine Parade Community Library was originally located at the town centre of Marine Parade Housing Estate before it shifted to its new premises at the community building. The library is Singapore's second-oldest public library and the only one built on reclaimed land. It started moving in stages to the community building in April 2000, and was officially opened by Goh Chok Tong on 28 May that year. The Marine Parade Community Library is the first public library in Singapore to be housed together with a community club and an arts group. The library's old premises was renovated for an NTUC FairPrice supermarket.

The library is spread over four floors of the Marine Parade Community Building, with a floor area of 3,500 square metres (37,675 square feet). As one of the first neighbourhood libraries, the library's entire second floor is its children's book section, featuring murals, trivia and multimedia tools. The library has more than 150,000 books and 2,500 videos available for loan. There is a café on the ground floor, and the library is fitted with numerous couches and benches for the public's use. Other facilities include multimedia stations, do-it-yourself service stations, and music posts equipped with headphones.

The Necessary Stage
The Necessary Stage was the first arts group to be housed in a community building with a community club by Singapore's National Arts Council (NAC). The move was part of the NAC's Arts Housing Scheme that offered alternative locations to arts groups besides old vacant buildings, in line with PA's plan to repackage its community clubs as fashionable multi-purpose spaces. The Necessary Stage's 672-square metre (7,467 square feet) premises at the basement of the community building was about three times the size of its old premises at Cairnhill Arts Centre, which did not have a proper theatre space for productions. The arts group's facility at the community building features a "Black Box", a stage-less theatre with flexible seating. The NAC spent S$2.1 million on construction costs for the unit at Marine Parade, which includes a foyer and the 120-seat Black Box.

Architecture
Overall, the architectural form of the Marine Parade Community Building has been described as a "dragon", with the roof as a crest and the artwork as the eye of the dragon. The horizontal louvres on the library block was seen as the tail fins of the dragon, an auspicious beast in Chinese culture.

Design concept
Sited adjacent to Housing and Development Board apartment blocks of the Marine Parade Housing Estate, the Marine Parade Community Building could be seen as an attempt to engage the wider community. The activities of the community building were planned to overlap and to coalesce, as a one-stop destination for the entire family. The rich congruence of the multiple programmes for the building is expressed architecturally as a collage of diverse elements. The building was designed by a local architectural firm, William Lim Associates, which adopted a postmodern pluralist approach, expressed through a multiplicity of materials and forms.

Wall mural

The community building is clad in a huge wall mural, a commissioned work of art by Thai architect Surachai Yeamsiri. The mural is Singapore's largest piece of installation art, measuring 63 metres by 12 metres (207 feet by 39 feet), and covers the curved north- and east-facing façade of the community building. Called the "Texturefulness of Life", the artwork made use of a variety of materials such as glass and wood. The artwork's centrepiece resembles a huge human eye plastered on a wall, made up of tiny mosaic tiles arranged by computer-aided design.

Surachai's abstract piece was the winner in the "Art on Wall" design competition, organised by the Marine Parade Community Club Management Committee in 1998. A panel of international judges picked the winning design from a total of 66 entries submitted by artists, architects and designers from all over Southeast Asia, including 40 entries from Singapore. Led by local art historian T. K. Sabapathy, the panel felt that the winning entry best reflected the contest's themes of dynamism, interaction, fusion and harmony. The mural was installed on the curved facade of the community building at a cost of S$50,000.

Other features
The library block is predominantly clad in glass, fitted with horizontal fins, on its frontage with the main road. The alfresco café had a street frontage and was spread into the shared forecourt. The roof of the community building resembles the leaves of a palm tree, and covers the community club's rooftop basketball court. The court's location on the roof level was a departure from the norm, as in other community centres then, the basketball court occupies space on the ground floor.

Notes and references

Further reading

External links

Library Board: Marine Parade Community Library
The Necessary Stage
Hybrid Design Culture of Contemporary Singapore: Marine Parade Community Centre

Community buildings in Singapore
Libraries in Singapore
Landmarks in Singapore
Government buildings completed in 2000
Marine Parade
20th-century architecture in Singapore